Birkir Már Sævarsson (born 11 November 1984) is an Icelandic professional footballer who plays as a defender for Úrvalsdeild side Valur.

Club career

Valur
Birkir started his professional career with local team Valur in the Úrvalsdeild, where he made his senior debut in 2003. He went on to play 66 competitive league games for the club, scoring twice, across five seasons. He won the 2007 Úrvalsdeild with Valur.

Brann
In 2008, at age 23, he joined the Norwegian side SK Brann in Tippeligaen. Before signing for Brann, Sævarsson had a trial with Bryne FK. Being known as a versatile defender, he was originally planned as a right back at Brann, but played almost all the 2009 season on the left back. He was often praised for his stamina, pace, and ability to contribute to the attacking play from his wing-back position. Birkir soon also became known for his scoring ability.

In 2011, his side reached the final in the Norwegian Cup, where Birkir played the whole game as Brann lost 1–2 to Aalesunds FK. Birkir played all minutes in every competitive game during the 2012 and 2013 seasons as right back.

Birkir signed a four-year contract extension with Brann in May 2013. During the reign of Swedish manager Rikard Norling, Birkir however lost his place as a regular starter at Brann. In 2014, Norling opted to play the homegrown youngster Andreas Vindheim instead of the Icelandic international. The season ultimately went horrible for Brann, who got relegated to the second tier after losing against Mjøndalen in qualification play.

The relegation also put an end to Birkir's 6.5-year spell at Brann, who transferred to the Swedish top-tier club Hammarby IF in December 2014. He reportedly left Brann on a free transfer.

Hammarby
At Hammarby he began the 2015 season as a centre-back, but eventually moved back to his natural position on the right flank after the arrival of Richard Magyar. After putting on impressive performances on both positions, he was voted as the "newcomer of the year" by the supporters. Birkir played 28 league games for his side, scoring twice, as Hammarby finished 11th in Allsvenskan. In 2016, Sævarsson played 27 competitive games, scoring once.

Birkir kept his place as a key player at Hammarby in 2017, as the club placed 9th in Allsvenskan, while providing five assists in 29 appearances. At the end of the year, Birkir sought to leave Hammarby at the expiration of his contract, seeking a new club ahead of the 2018 FIFA World Cup.

Return to Valur
Before the 2018 season, Birkir moved back to his native country and first professional club Valur. He signed a three-year deal with the reigning champions of Iceland. Birkir teamed up with his younger brother Aron Elí Sævarsson, born in 1997, in the squad.

International career
Birkir made his debut for the Iceland national team on 2 August 2007, in a 1–1 draw against Liechtenstein. Nine years later, on 6 June 2016, he scored his first national goal against the same opposition. Birkir slotted home a volley strike from far distance as Iceland won 4–0 in a friendly.

He played his first tournament at age 31, being selected for the UEFA Euro 2016 in France. In the second group stage game against Hungary, he scored an own goal resulting in a 1–1 draw. Birkir was praised for keeping the Portuguese winger Cristiano Ronaldo at bay in a group stage draw, as well as neutralizing Raheem Sterling in Iceland's sensational 2–1 win against England in the round of 16. Birkir played all minutes for Iceland during the tournament, where his side ultimately got knocked out in the quarter-final following a 5–2 loss against France.

In May 2018 he was named in Iceland's 23-man squad for the 2018 FIFA World Cup in Russia.

Birkir played his last game for the national team against North Macedonia on 14 November 2021.

Coaching career
On 15 April 2019, it was announced that Birkir was appointed as an assistant coach to 3. deild karla club Knattspyrnufélagið Hlíðarendi.

Career statistics

Club

International

Scores and results list Iceland's goal tally first, score column indicates score after each Birkir goal.

Honours
Valur
Úrvalsdeild: 2007
Icelandic Cup: 2005
League Cup: 2008

References

External links

1984 births
Living people
Birkir Mar Saevarsson
Association football defenders
Birkir Mar Saevarsson
Birkir Mar Saevarsson
Birkir Mar Saevarsson
Birkir Mar Saevarsson
Birkir Mar Saevarsson
Birkir Mar Saevarsson
SK Brann players
Expatriate footballers in Norway
Expatriate footballers in Sweden
Eliteserien players
Birkir Mar Saevarsson
Birkir Mar Saevarsson
Birkir Mar Saevarsson
UEFA Euro 2016 players
2018 FIFA World Cup players
FIFA Century Club
Allsvenskan players
Hammarby Fotboll players